Aykut Yiğit (7 October 1959 – 7 September 2002) was a Turkish professional football player who played as a striker, and a football manager until his death.

Aykut was top scorer during the 1983–84 1.Lig season with Sakaryaspor, the team he is best known for. He played for various Turkish teams before moving on to a management career. He died in a car accident while assistant manager for his first club Sakaryaspor.

International career
Aykut made his debut for the Turkey national football team in a friendly 0-0 draw with Bulgaria on 16 October 1984.

References

External links
  (as player)
  (as coach)
 

1959 births
2002 deaths
Sportspeople from Adapazarı
Turkish footballers
Turkish football managers
Turkey international footballers
Association football forwards
Süper Lig players
TFF First League players
Eskişehirspor footballers
Sakaryaspor footballers
Fenerbahçe S.K. footballers
Bakırköyspor footballers
Altay S.K. footballers
Balıkesirspor footballers
Road incident deaths in Turkey